Eucithara diaglypha is a small sea snail, a marine gastropod mollusk in the family Mangeliidae.

Description
The length of the shell attains 6 mm, its diameter 3 mm.

The small shell has an oval shape with a very short turriculated spire. The crystalline shell is thickened. It shows flexuous longitudinal ribs. These are numerous, low, with a rounded ridge, joining to their extended base. They are transversally surmounted by high, numerous, rounded, fairly strong cords. These are polished and shiny, which give them a tuberculous appearance. Between these the surface of the costulae and their intervals is remarkably covered with very fine transverse striations, flowing like wavy lines and latticed by the growth lines. The coloring is a very bright yellow in the interstices of the high ribs, presenting a tuberculate projection of a bright hyaline white. The yellow color tends to disappear on the upper whorls and at the base of the latter. The shell consists of 6 to 7 (?) whorls. The fractured apex did not allow the study of the embryonic whorls. The upper convex whorls  are  distinctly cone shaped and are very short by a subcanaliculate suture. The body whorl, exceeding 2/3 of the height of the shell, is swollen in its upper part, and its convexity, barely depressed below the middle, advances regularly attenuated to the base. The oblique aperture is narrowly elongated. The continuous peristome forms over all the length of its insertion on the columellar lip one rounded, rather prominent  small ridge. The convex outer lip is thickened, with a crenate, sharp margin and shows a series of 7 denticles. The slightly round sinus is lodged a little below the suture, notched in the thickening of the outer lip.

Distribution
This marine species occurs off New Caledonia and the Loyalty Islands

References

 Bouge, L.J. & Dautzenberg, P.L. 1914. Les Pleurotomides de la Nouvelle-Caledonie et de ses dependances. Journal de Conchyliologie 61: 123-214

External links
  Tucker, J.K. 2004 Catalog of recent and fossil turrids (Mollusca: Gastropoda). Zootaxa 682:1-1295.
 
 Virginie, et al. "Mollusca of New Caledonia." Compendium of marine species of New Caledonia. Documents Scientifiques et Techniques II7, 2nd edn. IRD, Nouméa (2007): 199-254
 Muséum d'Histoire Naturelle, Paris : Mangilia dealbata

diaglypha
Gastropods described in 1897